The environmental impact of the energy industry is significant, as energy and natural resource consumption are closely related. Producing, transporting, or consuming energy all have an environmental impact. Energy has been harnessed by human beings for millennia. Initially it was with the use of fire for light, heat, cooking and for safety, and its use can be traced back at least 1.9 million years. 
In recent years there has been a trend towards the increased commercialization of various renewable energy sources. Scientific consensus on some of the main human activities that contribute to global warming are considered to be increasing concentrations of greenhouse gases, causing a warming effect, global changes to land surface, such as deforestation, for a warming effect, increasing concentrations of aerosols, mainly for a cooling effect.

Rapidly advancing technologies can potentially achieve a transition of energy generation, water and waste management, and food production towards better environmental and energy usage practices using methods of systems ecology and industrial ecology.

Issues

Climate change
 

The scientific consensus on global warming and climate change is that it is caused by anthropogenic greenhouse gas emissions, the majority of which comes from burning fossil fuels with deforestation and some agricultural practices being also major contributors. A 2013 study showed that two thirds of the industrial greenhouse gas emissions are due to the fossil-fuel (and cement) production of just ninety companies around the world (between 1751 and 2010, with half emitted since 1986).

Although there is a highly publicized denial of climate change, the vast majority of scientists working in climatology accept that it is due to human activity. The IPCC report Climate Change 2007: Climate Change Impacts, Adaptation and Vulnerability predicts that climate change will cause shortages of food and water and increased risk of flooding that will affect billions of people, particularly those living in poverty.

One measurement of greenhouse gas related and other Externality comparisons between energy sources can be found in the ExternE project by the Paul Scherrer Institut and the University of Stuttgart which was funded by the European Commission. According to that study, hydroelectric electricity produces the lowest  emissions, wind produces the second-lowest, nuclear energy produces the third-lowest and solar photovoltaic produces the fourth-lowest.

Similarly, the same research study (ExternE, Externalities of Energy), undertaken from 1995 to 2005 found that the cost of producing electricity from coal or oil would double over its present value, and the cost of electricity production from gas would increase by 30% if external costs such as damage to the environment and to human health, from the airborne particulate matter, nitrogen oxides, chromium VI and arsenic emissions produced by these sources, were taken into account. It was estimated in the study that these external, downstream, fossil fuel costs amount up to 1–2% of the EU's entire Gross Domestic Product (GDP), and this was before the external cost of global warming from these sources was even included. The study also found that the environmental and health costs of nuclear power, per unit of energy delivered, was €0.0019/kWh, which was found to be lower than that of many renewable sources including that caused by biomass and photovoltaic solar panels, and was thirty times lower than coal at €0.06/kWh, or 6 cents/kWh, with the energy sources of the lowest external environmental and health costs associated with it being wind power at €0.0009/kWh.

Biofuel use

Biofuel is defined as solid, liquid or gaseous fuel obtained from relatively recently lifeless or living biological material and is different from fossil fuels, which are derived from long-dead biological material. Various plants and plant-derived materials are used for biofuel manufacturing.

Bio-diesel

High use of bio-diesel leads to land use changes including deforestation.

Firewood

Unsustainable firewood harvesting can lead to loss of biodiversity and erosion due to loss of forest cover. An example of this is a 40-year study done by the University of Leeds of African forests, which account for a third of the world's total tropical forest which demonstrates that Africa is a significant carbon sink. A climate change expert, Lee White states that "To get an idea of the value of the sink, the removal of nearly 5 billion tonnes of carbon dioxide from the atmosphere by intact tropical forests is at issue.

According to the U.N. the African continent is losing forest twice as fast as the rest of the world. "Once upon a time, Africa boasted seven million square kilometers of forest but a third of that has been lost, most of it to charcoal."

Fossil fuel use

The three fossil fuel types are coal, petroleum and natural gas. It was estimated by the Energy Information Administration that in 2006 primary sources of energy consisted of petroleum 36.8%, coal 26.6%, natural gas 22.9%, amounting to an 86% share for fossil fuels in primary energy production in the world.

In 2013 the burning of fossil fuels produced around 32 billion tonnes (32 gigatonnes) of carbon dioxide and additional air pollution. This caused negative externalities of $4.9 trillion due to global warming and health problems (> 150 $/ton carbon dioxide). Carbon dioxide is one of the greenhouse gases that enhances radiative forcing and contributes to global warming, causing the average surface temperature of the Earth to rise in response, which climate scientists agree will cause major adverse effects.

Coal

Petroleum

Gas

Natural gas is often described as the cleanest fossil fuel, producing less carbon dioxide per joule delivered than either coal or oil, and far fewer pollutants than other fossil fuels.  However, in absolute terms, it does contribute substantially to global carbon emissions, and this contribution is projected to grow. According to the IPCC Fourth Assessment Report, in 2004 natural gas produced about 5,300 Mt/yr of CO2 emissions, while coal and oil produced 10,600 and 10,200 respectively (Figure 4.4); but by 2030, according to an updated version of the SRES B2 emissions scenario, natural gas would be the source of 11,000 Mt/yr, with coal and oil now 8,400 and 17,200 respectively. (Total global emissions for 2004 were estimated at over 27,200 Mt.)

In addition, natural gas itself is a greenhouse gas far more potent than carbon dioxide when released into the atmosphere but is released in smaller amounts. The environmental impacts of Natural gas also vary substantially on their extraction processes, much natural gas is a byproduct of heavily polluting petroleum extraction and newer techniques for hydraulic fracturing have made natural gas reserves that were previously unaccusable available, but with many more negative environmental and health impacts that traditional natural gas extraction.

Electricity generation

The environmental impact of electricity generation is significant because modern society uses large amounts of electrical power.  This power is normally generated at power plants that convert some other kind of energy into electrical power.  Each such system has advantages and disadvantages, but many of them pose environmental concerns.

Reservoirs

Nuclear power

The environmental impact of nuclear power results from the nuclear fuel cycle, operation, and the effects of nuclear accidents.

The routine health risks and greenhouse gas emissions from nuclear fission power are significantly smaller than those associated with coal, oil and gas. However, there is a "catastrophic risk" potential if containment fails, which in nuclear reactors can be brought about by over-heated fuels melting and releasing large quantities of fission products into the environment. The most long-lived radioactive wastes, including spent nuclear fuel, must be contained and isolated from humans and the environment for hundreds of thousands of years. The public is sensitive to these risks and there has been considerable public opposition to nuclear power. Despite this potential for disaster, normal fossil fuel related pollution is still considerably more harmful than any previous nuclear disaster.

The 1979 Three Mile Island accident and 1986 Chernobyl disaster, along with high construction costs, ended the rapid growth of global nuclear power capacity. A further disastrous release of radioactive materials followed the 2011 Japanese tsunami which damaged the Fukushima I Nuclear Power Plant, resulting in hydrogen gas explosions and partial meltdowns classified as a Level 7 event. The large-scale release of radioactivity resulted in people being evacuated from a 20 km exclusion zone set up around the power plant, similar to the 30 km radius Chernobyl Exclusion Zone still in effect.

Mitigation

Energy conservation

Energy conservation refers to efforts made to reduce energy consumption. Energy conservation can be achieved through increased efficient energy use, in conjunction with decreased energy consumption and/or reduced consumption from conventional energy sources.

Energy conservation can result in increased financial capital, environmental quality, national security, personal security, and human comfort.  Individuals and organizations that are direct consumers of energy choose to conserve energy to reduce energy costs and promote economic security. Industrial and commercial users can increase energy use efficiency to maximize profit.

The increase of global energy use can also be slowed by tackling human population growth, by using non-coercive measures such as better provision of family planning services and by empowering (educating) women in developing countries.

An EU survey conducted on climate and energy consumption in 2022 found that 63% of people in the European Union want energy costs to be dependent on use, with the greatest consumers paying more. This is compared to 83% in China, 63% in the UK and 57% in the US.

Energy policy

Energy policy is the manner in which a given entity (often governmental) has decided to address issues of energy development including energy production, distribution and consumption.  The attributes of energy policy may include legislation, international treaties, incentives to investment, guidelines for energy conservation, taxation and other public policy techniques.

See also

 Energy accounting
 Energy & Environment
 Energy economics
 Energy flow (ecology)
 Energy industry
 Energy quality
 Energy transformation
 Environmental impact of aviation
 Environmental impact of electricity generation
 Environmental impact of hydraulic fracturing
 Index of energy articles
 Industrial ecology
 List of energy storage projects
 List of environmental issues
 Low-carbon power
 Systems ecology
 The Venus Project
 Thermoeconomics

References

External links

United Nations Development Programme – Environment and Energy for Sustainable Development
Discussion of environmental cost of providing renewable energy – Environment impact of renewable energy technologies